Grip Digital (also known as Grip Games) is  a developer and publisher of video games based in Prague, Czech Republic. It focuses on developing and publishing video games. Its main focus are consoles.

History
The studio was established by Jakub Mikyska and Jan Cabuk. Studio focused to PlayStation Portable consoles but eventually moved to PlayStation 3 and Vita. Employees of Grip Digital were recruited in Studios such as 2K Czech or Disney Mobile.

Grip Digital later got in touch with Teotl Studios, authors of Unmechanical. Grip Digital developed the Extended version of the game. Teotl Studios then decided to keep the cooperation and both studios started to work together on The Solus Project.

Games

References

Video game development companies
Video game publishers
Video game companies of the Czech Republic
Video game companies established in 2009
Companies based in Prague
Czech companies established in 2009